River Park is a multifunction center on the river Danube in Bratislava with the overall area of 32 000 m². It contains 200 luxury flats and apartments, 5-star Kempinski hotel, various restaurants and shops, and a rest area with green places, trees and a promenade.

Location 
River Park is located on the left river Donau bank between the Park kultúry a oddychu bridge Most SNP. Its location in the city center makes it easily accessible from all city districts and via the direct city transport network also from Vienna, Budapest, Prague etc.

Division 
River Park consists of 4 blocks. In the underground area are 3 floors with over 1100 parking places, 400 are exclusively for the River Park inhabitants.

Block 1 is on the western side and contains flats and shops with administration.

River House is the main dominant of the complex. Its construction is beyond the promenade and ends over the river level. Inside are apartments, and in the northern part are administration offices.

Grand Hotel River Park with the ground plan of letter L makes the square of the complex with the River House. 5-star hotel offers accommodation, congress halls, restaurant, bars and recreation facilities including swimming pools, fitness and wellness areas.

Block 4 is the biggest block in the eastern part of the complex and is the closest to the city center. Also here are flats with windows oriented to the Donau and offices oriented to the north. At the ground floor are various public utilities and services.

For parking there are underground floors with over 1100 parking places and areas for the technical equipment for the whole complex.

Flats 
All flats are in the southern part of the complex. The flat area is between 70 m² and 535 m², and each contains a balcony or loggia.

Services 
In each apartment should be a broadband internet connection and a cable TV. There is also:
house maintenance service - cleaning of corridors, entrances, etc.
security service
non-stop open and secured parking places
room service
Other services include 
 Airport Shuttle Service
 cleaning services
 washing room

References

External links 
 Official homepage
 Hotel webpage

Buildings and structures in Bratislava